Percy Evans Freke (1844–1931) was an Irish ornithologist and entomologist.

Freke was born in Dublin. At age 21, he enlisted in the 44th Essex Regiment. Two years later, in 1887, he exchanged to the 18th Royal Irish Regiment and after serving two years in New Zealand he retired from the army and returned to Ireland. For seven years, from 1872 to 1879, Freke operated a tobacco plantation in Amelia County, Virginia, about 30 miles southwest of Richmond. He once more returned to Ireland and then in 1899 took up residence at Folkestone in Kent. He was, from 1883, a Corresponding Fellow of the American Ornithologists' Union.

Works
Partial list
1880 A comparative catalogue of birds found in Europe and North America.The Scientific proceedings of the Royal Dublin Society, Vol. II, pp. 373–416, April, p. 634, Nov., 1880
1883 North-American birds crossing the Atlantic.The Scientific proceedings of the Royal Dublin Society, Vol. III, pp. 22–33, 1883
1883 On birds observed in Amelia county, Virginia.The Scientific proceedings of the Royal Dublin Society, Vol. III, pp. 61–92 1883
1896 A list of Irish Hymenoptera Aculesta.The Irish naturalist: a monthly journal of general Irish natural history, Vol. V, No. 2, pp. 39–43, Feb., 1896, No. 11, p. 294, Nov., 1896
1897 with Cuthbert, H. K Gore Additions to the list of Irish aculeate hymenoptera, during 1897.The Irish naturalist: a monthly journal of general Irish natural history, Vol. VI, No. 12, p. 324, December 1897
The Scientific proceedings of the Royal Dublin Society online at BHL

References

Irish ornithologists
Irish entomologists
1844 births
1931 deaths
Scientists from Dublin (city)
Royal Irish Regiment (1684–1922) officers